Gianluigi Quinzi was the defending champion, but was no longer eligible to compete in junior tennis, and thus could not defend his title.

Noah Rubin defeated Stefan Kozlov in the final, 6–4, 4–6, 6–3 to win the boys' singles tennis title at the 2014 Wimbledon Championships.

Seeds

  Andrey Rublev (third round)
  Chung Hyeon (quarterfinals)
  Orlando Luz (first round)
  Jaume Munar (second round)
  Quentin Halys (first round)
  Stefan Kozlov (final)
  Frances Tiafoe (third round)
  Johan Tatlot (semifinals)
  Naoki Nakagawa (third round)
  Lee Duck-hee (first round)
  Michael Mmoh (third round)
  Kamil Majchrzak (second round)
  Matías Zukas (second round)
  Marcelo Zormann (second round)
  Jumpei Yamasaki (first round)
  Daniil Medvedev (first round)

Draw

Finals

Top half

Section 1

Section 2

Bottom half

Section 3

Section 4

References

External links

Boys' Singles
Wimbledon Championship by year – Boys' singles